The Auckland Tuatara are a semi-professional basketball team based in Auckland, New Zealand. The Tuatara compete in the National Basketball League (NBL) and play their home games at Eventfinda Stadium. Founded in Tasmania in 2019 as the Southern Huskies, the team relocated to Auckland in 2020 and for two years were known as the Auckland Huskies. In December 2021, the team was purchased by the Auckland Tuatara baseball team.

History

In Tasmania
In 2016, sights were set on an Australian NBL franchise returning to Tasmania, with the state having no representation in the national league since the demise of the Hobart Devils in 1996. The Hobart Chargers of the South East Australian Basketball League (SEABL) wanted to be "NBL ready" in three years. By 2018, basketball was considered on the rise in Tasmania, with the popularity of the sport hitting peak interest for the first time since the 1990s. In mid-2018, plans to get the Chargers into the Australian NBL morphed into an overarching Tasmanian bid for a proposed new franchise to be called Southern Huskies. The bid and its NBA-style branding was well received upon being unveiled, with born-and-bred Tasmanian, and former Devils player, Justin Hickey deciding to back the team financially as franchise owner. At the crux of his proposal was the Derwent Entertainment Centre (DEC), having made an unsolicited bid to buy the arena and renovate it. The Huskies bid ultimately fell through when Hickey failed to acquire the DEC, compounded with the league believing there were several hurdles and shortcomings with the bid. As a result, the Australian NBL licence for the 2019–20 season instead went to the South East Melbourne Phoenix. In 2020, a new entity the Tasmania JackJumpers were accepted into the Australian NBL for the 2021–22 season.

In November 2018, reports began to surface that the Southern Huskies would be entering the New Zealand NBL in 2019, with the Huskies viewing the New Zealand league as a launch pad to the Australian NBL and the stronger competition more appealing than the various Australian state leagues. The inclusion, while an exciting one for the New Zealand league, did present a number of unprecedented challenges for the competition, with flights to Tasmania problematic for New Zealand's less financially well-off franchises, while double or triple-headers on New Zealand trips for the Huskies were a looming issue. Despite these concerns, NZNBL chairman Iain Potter said the move had the support of the existing eight franchises.

On 5 December 2018, a five-year contract was signed between the New Zealand NBL and the Southern Huskies, marking the first time in New Zealand sporting history that an overseas team had joined a New Zealand owned league. The 2019 season saw each New Zealand team visit Tasmania to play the Huskies at least once, while the Huskies played every New Zealand team in New Zealand as well, playing double-headers each time they crossed the Tasman. As part of the agreement, the Huskies assisted with the cost for New Zealand teams to travel to Tasmania to play, with the NZNBL Board not wanting to increase the New Zealand teams' expenses through this move. The Huskies' nine home games in 2019 were split between the Derwent Entertainment Centre in Hobart and the Silverdome in Launceston. Coached by former Australian NBL player Anthony Stewart, the inaugural squad included imports Jalen Billups and Tre Nichols alongside Harry Froling, Marcel Jones, Craig Moller and Jordan Vandenberg. The Huskies concluded their first season in the NZNBL missing the post-season with a fifth-place finish and a 9–9 record.

On 27 June 2019, the Huskies announced that they would rebrand as the Tasmanian Huskies for the 2020 season in order to remove any stigma of a division within the state. This announcement came days after it was revealed that any new team from the state in the Australian NBL must be branded Tasmanian. However, on 9 August 2019, the Huskies withdrew from the New Zealand NBL after they claimed their relationship with Basketball Tasmania became untenable, with mounting debts also cited as a factor for disbanding.

NBL1
On 17 December 2018, following the Hobart Chargers' decision to withdraw from the Victorian-managed NBL1, an affiliate club known as the Hobart Huskies was entered into the NBL1 by the Southern Huskies with both men's and women's teams. In conjunction with the Southern Huskies withdrawing from the New Zealand NBL on 9 August 2019, the Hobart Huskies NBL1 teams were also abolished after one season.

In Auckland
In May 2020, the Southern Huskies re-emerged and relocated permanently to Auckland, New Zealand, and became the Auckland Huskies. They subsequently entered the 2020 New Zealand NBL season, a competition that was revised and modified due the COVID-19 pandemic. Coached by former Australian and New Zealand NBL player Kevin Braswell, the 2020 squad featured Leon Henry, Izayah Le'afa and Tohi Smith-Milner. The Huskies' 2020 campaign saw them lose in the second elimination final after finishing third with an 8–6 record.

For the 2021 New Zealand NBL season, the Huskies played at Eventfinda Stadium. The 2021 squad featured Justin Bibbs, Chris Johnson, Jeremy Kendle and Tom Vodanovich.

In December 2021, the owners of the Auckland Tuatara baseball team purchased the NZNBL licence from the Huskies owners and re-named the team the Auckland Tuatara. Behind the likes of Chris Johnson and Robert Loe, the Tuatara finished fifth in the 2022 regular season with a 10–8 record and went on to reach the NBL final for the first time in franchise history. In the final, they lost 81–73 to the Otago Nuggets.

Current roster

References

External links
 
 
 "Plan to put Huskies in Aust NBL takes them via NZ" at odt.co.nz
 "Huskies visionary owner Justin Hickey reveals his motivation to deliver Tasmania its own statewide basketball side and a path into the NBL" at theadvocate.com.au
 "How the Southern Huskies shocked Tasmania and returned in Auckland" at pickandroll.com.au
 "Auckland Huskies NBL team to become Auckland Tuatara as baseball club expands empire" at stuff.co.nz

2018 establishments in Australia
Basketball teams established in 2018
Basketball teams in Auckland
Basketball teams in New Zealand
Basketball teams in Tasmania
National Basketball League (New Zealand) teams
Sport in Auckland
Sport in Hobart